Karl Beurlen (17 April 1901 – 27 December 1985) was a German paleontologist.

Beurlen was born in Aalen. He attended University of Tübingen. He completed a PhD in 1923.

Beurlen was a proponent of orthogenesis and saltational evolution. He used the term metakinesis (coined by Otto Jaekel) to describe sudden changes of development in organisms. He also invented the term palingenesis as a mechanism for his orthogenetic theory of evolution.

He was an assistant of Edwin Hennig.

He was a proponent of National Socialist ideology and wrote about the Aryan race.

He was director of the Zoologische Staatssammlung München.

See also
Otto Schindewolf

References

1901 births
1985 deaths
German paleontologists
Orthogenesis